Miss America 1943, the 17th Miss America pageant, was held at the Warner Theater in Atlantic City, New Jersey on September 11, 1943. Miss California, Jean Bartel won the title after winning awards for her swimsuit and talent.

Results

Awards

Preliminary awards

Other awards

Contestants

References

Secondary sources

External links
 Miss America official website

1943
1943 in the United States
1943 in New Jersey
September 1943 events
Events in Atlantic City, New Jersey